The 1948 AAA Championship Car season consisted of 12 races, beginning in Arlington, Texas on April 25 and concluding in Du Quoin, Illinois on October 10.  The AAA National Champion was Ted Horn, and the Indianapolis 500 winner was Mauri Rose. Ralph Hepburn was killed at Indianapolis in practice, and Ted Horn was killed at the last race in DuQuoin.

Schedule and results

  Both Bettenhausen and Fohr were credited with wins for the race as Bettenhausen relieved Fohr on Lap 118 of 200.
  No pole is awarded for the Pikes Peak Hill Climb, in this schedule on the pole is the driver who started first. No lap led was awarded for the Pikes Peak Hill Climb, however, a lap was awarded to the drivers that completed the climb.

Final points standings

Note: The points became the car, when not only one driver led the car, the relieved driver became small part of the points. Points for driver method: (the points for the finish place) / (number the lap when completed the car) * (number the lap when completed the driver)

References
 
 
 
 http://media.indycar.com/pdf/2011/IICS_2011_Historical_Record_Book_INT6.pdf  (p. 310-312)

See also
 1948 Indianapolis 500

AAA Championship Car season
AAA Championship Car
1948 in American motorsport